Austria has participated at the Youth Olympic Games in every edition since the inaugural 2010 Games and has earned gold medals from every edition.

Hosted Games 
Austria has hosted the Games on one occasion.

Medal tables 

*Red border color indicates tournament was held on home soil.

Medals by Summer Games

Medals by Winter Games

Medals by summer sport

Medals by winter sport

List of medalists

Summer Games

Summer Games medalists as part of Mixed-NOCs Team

Winter Games

Winter Games medalists as part of Mixed-NOCs Team

Flag bearers

See also
Austria at the Olympics
Austria at the Paralympics

External links
Austrian Olympic Committee

 
Nations at the Youth Olympic Games
Youth sport in Austria